Bhavans Vidya Mandir, Eroor is a secondary school with an affiliation to the Central Board of Secondary Education (CBSE). It is one of the six schools of the Bharatiya Vidya Bhavan, Kochi Kendra and is located within the outskirts of Thripunithura, Kerala.

References

External links

http://www.bhavanseroor.ac.in/

https://school.careers360.com/schools/bhavans-vidya-mandir-eroor-west-tripunithura

Schools affiliated with the Bharatiya Vidya Bhavan
Private schools in Kochi
1989 establishments in Kerala